Reisen Ri (李麗仙; 25 March 1942 – 22 June 2021) was a Japanese stage and film actress of Korean descent. 

Born in Tokyo as a third-generation Korean resident, she joined Jūrō Kara's "Situation Theatre" in 1963 and gave her film debut in Nagisa Ōshima's 1969 Diary of a Shinjuku Thief. In 1972, she starred in Hiroshi Teshigahara's film Summer Soldiers.

Ri was married to Kara from 1967 to 1988. She died in Tokyo on 22 June 2021, aged 79.

References

20th-century Japanese actresses
1942 births
2021 deaths
People from Tokyo
Place of death missing